The Unstrut culture was part of the Bronze Age Urnfield culture, a homogeneous society noted for their biconical funerary urns used in storing the ashes of the deceased. The Unstrut (stone packing graves) group settled in Germany, particularly in the central region where the Saale mouth (stone cists) group also lived. These two groups, along with the Helmsdorf or Elb-Havel group formed on the western edge of the Lausitz culture.

References

Urnfield culture
Archaeological cultures of Central Europe
Bronze Age cultures of Europe
Archaeological cultures in Germany
History of Thuringia
Articles needing translation from Polish Wikipedia